Holcomb is an unincorporated community in Ogle County, Illinois, United States. Holcomb has a post office with ZIP code 61043. Holcomb was founded in 1876. It was named for William H. Holcomb (c. 1839–1908), General Manager of the Chicago and Iowa Railroad at the time. He was also the Superintendent of Transportation for the World's Columbian Exposition held in Chicago in 1893.

Demographics

Gallery

References

1876 establishments in Illinois
Unincorporated communities in Ogle County, Illinois
Unincorporated communities in Illinois